Baldwin is an Old Germanic and Anglo-Saxon name. It may either derive from Bealdwine, or the Old German equivalent Baldavin, meaning "brave, bold friend".

It is found in many other modern European languages: French Baudoin, Italian Baldovino, Dutch Boudewijn, Spanish and Esperanto Balduino.

Surname
 A. Michael Baldwin (born 1963), American actor
 Abraham Baldwin (1754–1807), American politician
 Adam Baldwin (born 1962), American actor
 Agnes Baldwin (disambiguation), several people
 Alec Baldwin (born 1958), American actor, oldest and best known of the "Baldwin brothers"
 Alfred Baldwin (disambiguation), several people
 Andrew Baldwin (born 1977), United States Navy officer, participant on The Bachelor television series
 Arthur Baldwin, 3rd Earl Baldwin of Bewdley (1904–1976), British businessman
 Augustus C. Baldwin (1817–1903), U.S. Representative from Michigan
 Augustus Warren Baldwin (1776–1866), politician in Upper Canada
 Bill Baldwin (1935–2015), United States science fiction writer
 Bob Baldwin (politician) (born 1955), Australian politician
 Bobby Baldwin (born 1950), United States poker player
 Brian Baldwin (1958–1999), American man executed in Alabama
 Brooke Baldwin (born 1979), CNN Newsroom anchor
 Cecil Baldwin, voice actor for the podcast Welcome to Night Vale
 Charles Baldwin (disambiguation), several people
 Charlotte Fowler Baldwin (1805–1873), American missionary
 Christopher Baldwin (born 1973), Illustrator and author of webcomics
 Chuck Baldwin (born 1952), 2008 Constitution Party nominee for President of the United States
 Clare Baldwin, American journalist
 Cliff Baldwin (1899–1979), American football player
 Craig Baldwin (born 1952), American filmmaker
 Cyrus Baldwin (1773–1854), American civil engineer
 Cyrus G. Baldwin (1852–1931) American minister, college professor, and college president
 Daniel Baldwin (born 1960), American actor, producer, and director, one of the "Baldwin brothers"
 Daniel P. Baldwin (1837-1908), American politician
 Daryl Baldwin, Miami researcher and cultural activist
 Dave Baldwin (disambiguation), several people
 Daylen Baldwin (born 1999), American football player
 Dick Baldwin (1911-1996), American actor
 Donny Baldwin, American rock drummer
 Doug Baldwin (born 1988), American football player
 Doug Baldwin (ice hockey) (1922–2007), Canadian ice hockey player 
 Dwight Baldwin (disambiguation), several people
 Edith Ella Baldwin (1848–1920), American artist
 Edward Baldwin, 4th Earl Baldwin of Bewdley (1938–2021), British educator 
 Elias J. Baldwin American entrepreneur, landowner, investor  
 Ephraim Francis Baldwin (1837–1916), American architect
 Esther E. Baldwin (1840–1910), American missionary, teacher, translator, writer, editor
 Faith Baldwin (1893–1978), U.S. author of romance and fiction
 Frank Baldwin (1842–1923), one of only 19 servicemen to receive the Medal of Honor twice
 Frank Stephen Baldwin (1838–1925), American who invented a pinwheel calculator
 Frederick W. Baldwin (1882–1948), hydrofoil and aviation pioneer 
 Ged Baldwin (1907–1991), Canadian politician
 George Baldwin (disambiguation), several people
 Graham Baldwin (born c. 1954), British anti-cult activist
 Greg Baldwin (born 1960), American voice actor
 Harry Baldwin (cricketer) (1860–1935), English cricketer
 Harry Streett Baldwin (1894–1952), U.S. Congressman 
 Henry Baldwin (disambiguation), several people
 Howard Baldwin (born 1942), American businessman
 Howard S. Baldwin (1934–2008), American politician and businessman
 Ira Baldwin (1895–1999), founder and director emeritus of the Wisconsin Academy Foundation
 J. Baldwin (1933–2018), American industrial designer, author, and educator
 J. Rush Baldwin, American politician
 Jack Baldwin (disambiguation), several people
 James Baldwin (disambiguation), several people
 Jason Baldwin, one of the West Memphis Three
 Jerry Baldwin, American businessman
 John Baldwin (disambiguation), several people
 Joseph Baldwin (disambiguation), several people 
 Kaine Baldwin (born 2002), Australian Football  Player 
 Kathleen Baldwin, American writer of comic romance novels
 Karen Dianne Baldwin (born 1963), Canadian actress
 Keith Baldwin (born 1960), American football player
 Lewis V. Baldwin, historian, author, and professor specializing in the history of the black churches in the United States
 Loammi Baldwin (1744–1807), American engineer, politician, and a soldier in the American Revolutionary War
 Loammi Baldwin Jr. (1780–1838), American civil engineer
 Mark Baldwin (disambiguation), several people
 Mary Briscoe Baldwin (1811-1877), American missionary educator
 Matthias W. Baldwin (1795–1866), American steam locomotive builder, founder of Baldwin Locomotive Works
 Melvin Baldwin (1838–1901), Representative from Minnesota
 Michele Baldwin (1966-2012) also known as Lady Ganga, stand up paddled 700 miles down the Ganges River to raise awareness of Cervical Cancer
 Mike Baldwin (motorcyclist) (born 1955), American professional motorcycle road racer
 Oliver Baldwin, 2nd Earl Baldwin of Bewdley (1899–1958), British socialist politician
 Patrick Baldwin Jr. (born 2002), American basketball player
 Percival G. Baldwin (1880–1936), American politician and businessman
 Peter Baldwin (disambiguation), several people
 Raymond E. Baldwin (1893–1986), United States Senator, the 72nd and 74th Governor of Connecticut
Richard J. Baldwin (1853-1944), Pennsylvania State Representative, Pennsylvania State Senator, Speaker of the Pennsylvania House of Representatives
 Robert Baldwin (disambiguation), several people
 Roger Nash Baldwin (1884–1981), founder of ACLU
 Roger Sherman Baldwin (1793–1863), US lawyer and politician
 Roy E. Baldwin (born 1948), member of the Pennsylvania House of Representatives
 Roy Alvin Baldwin (1885–1940), member of the Texas House of Representatives
 Roy Baldwin (footballer) (born 1927), Australian rules footballer
 Ruth Baldwin (c. 1761–1788), aka Ruth Bowyer, a convict sent to Australia on the First Fleet
 Sally Baldwin (1940–2003), University of York social sciences professor
 Shauna Singh Baldwin (born 1962), Canadian-American novelist 
 Simeon Baldwin (1761–1851), son-in-law of Roger Sherman
 Simeon Eben Baldwin (1840–1927), jurist, law professor and the 65th Governor of Connecticut
 Simon Baldwin (born 1975), rugby league footballer
 Stanley Baldwin (1867–1947), three-time prime minister of the United Kingdom
 Stephen Baldwin (born 1966), American actor, youngest of the "Baldwin brothers"
 Stephen Baldwin (politician) (born 1982), American politician, West Virginia state Senator
 Sumner Baldwin (1833–1903), New York politician
 Tammy Baldwin (born 1962), American politician, Senator from Wisconsin, first openly homosexual Senator
 Theodore Anderson Baldwin (1839–1925), U.S. military officer during the American Civil War and the Spanish–American War
 Thomas Scott Baldwin (1860–1923), U.S. Army Major and pioneer balloonist
 Tom Baldwin (racing driver) (1947–2004), NASCAR Modified race driver
 Tommy Baldwin (born 1945), English footballer 
 Tommy Baldwin Jr. (born 1966), team majority owner of Tommy Baldwin Racing in the Monster Energy NASCAR Cup Series
 Tony Baldwin, (born 1973), college softball coach
 Wade Baldwin IV (born 1996), American basketball player for Maccabi Tel Aviv of the Israeli Basketball Premier League
 Walter Baldwin (1889−1977), American film and television actor 
 William Baldwin (disambiguation), several people

Rulers and nobles 

 Baldwin I of Jerusalem (also Baldwin I of Edessa, 1058?–1118)
 Baldwin II of Jerusalem (also Baldwin II of Edessa, died 1131)
 Baldwin III of Jerusalem (1130–1162)
 Baldwin IV of Jerusalem (1161–1185)
 Baldwin V of Jerusalem (1177–1186)
 Baldwin I of Ramla (died 1138)
 Baldwin of Ibelin (also Baldwin III of Ramla, early 1130s – c. 1187 or 1186/1188)
 Baldwin I of Flanders (probably 830s – 879)
 Baldwin II of Flanders (865–918, also Baldwin I of Boulogne)
 Baldwin III of Flanders (c. 940–962)
 Baldwin IV of Flanders (980–1035)
 Baldwin V of Flanders (1012–1067)
 Baldwin VI of Flanders (also Baldwin I, Count of Hainaut)
 Baldwin VII of Flanders (1093–1119)
 Baldwin VIII of Flanders (1030–1070)
 Baldwin I of Constantinople (also Baldwin IX of Flanders and Baldwin VI, Count of Hainaut, 1172–1205)
 Baldwin II of Constantinople (1217–1273)
 Baldwin II of Boulogne (died circa 1027)
 Baldwin II, Count of Hainaut (1056–1098?)
 Baldwin III, Count of Hainaut (1088–1120)
 Baldwin IV, Count of Hainaut (1108–1171)
 Baldwin V, Count of Hainaut (1150–1195)
 Baudouin I of Belgium (1930–1993), called "Baldwin" in English
 Baldwin of Exeter (c. 1125–1190), Archbishop of Canterbury
 Baldwin de Redvers, 1st Earl of Devon (died 1155)
 Baldwin de Redvers, 6th Earl of Devon (1217–1245)
 British prime minister Stanley Baldwin, later ennobled to Earl Baldwin of Bewdley (1937)
 Baldwin of Biggar (fl.1160-1170), Flemish/Scots magnate, Sheriff of Clydesdale
 Baldovin, Serbian noble

Others 

 Baldwin (abbot of Bury St Edmunds) (died 1097)
 Baldwin of Rieti (died 1140), saint
 Baldwin of Forde (died 1190) Archbishop of Canterbury
 Baldwin of Luxembourg (c. 1285–1354), Archbishop of Trier
 Baldwin (archbishop of Pisa) (died 1145)
 Baldwin Domingo (1926-2020), American politician

Fictional characters 
 Robbie Baldwin, a superhero in Marvel Comics
In the soap opera Coronation Street:
 Carol Baldwin
 Danny Baldwin
 Frankie Baldwin
 Jamie Baldwin
 Mike Baldwin (Coronation Street)
 Viv Baldwin
 Warren Baldwin
In the soap opera The Young and the Restless:
 Eden Baldwin
 Lauren Fenmore Baldwin
 Michael Baldwin
 River Baldwin
 Baldwin Montclair from serie "Discovery of witches"

See also 
 
 
 
 
 Baldwin I (disambiguation)
 Baldwin II (disambiguation)
 Baldwin III (disambiguation)
 Baldwin IV
 Baldwin V
 Baldwin VI (disambiguation)

References

English-language surnames
Germanic-language surnames